Cyrus Alai (Persian: سیروس علایی) is a Persian-British engineer, map collector and the author of the book "General Maps of Persia".

Alai was born in Tehran and studied at Technical University of Berlin. Before the 1979 revolution he was a lecturer at Tehran University. Shortly after the revolution he moved to London.

Alai has contributed to various publications such as the Encyclopedia Iranica for the entries related to cartography of Persia.

He is the author of two books "General Maps of Persia" and "Special Maps of Persia" which have been published by Brill Publications in the Netherlands in 2006 and 2009.  He donated his huge collection of Persian maps to the University of London.

Sources
 General Maps of Persia 1477 - 1925 (Brill)
 Cyrus Alai served for nine years as the honorary treasurer of the International Map Collectors' Society (SOAS)

External links
 An Interview with Cyrus Alai (Video)

References

20th-century Iranian engineers
Living people
Year of birth missing (living people)
Writers from Tehran
Technical University of Berlin alumni
Academic staff of the University of Tehran
Iranian emigrants to England
20th-century non-fiction writers